Vince Guaraldi, Bola Sete and Friends (stylized as Vince Guaraldi \ Bola Sete \ and Friends) is a collaboration between pianist Vince Guaraldi and guitarist Bola Sete released in January 1964 by Fantasy Records. It was Guaraldi's fourth studio album and the first of three studio collaborations with Sete.

Release and reception 

Richard S. Ginell of AllMusic gave the album four and a half out of five stars, praising Guaraldi and Sete for fluidly combining their styles.

Guaraldi historian and author Derrick Bang offered equal praise, stating that Guaraldi and Sete represented "the perfect musical marriage," adding that Vince Guaraldi, Bola Sete and Friends is the "most consistent" of their three album collaborations.

In 2000, Vince Guaraldi, Bola Sete and Friends was issued on CD coupled with Live at El Matador (1966) as Vince & Bola.

Track listing

Personnel 
Bola Sete – guitar
Vince Guaraldi Trio
Vince Guaraldi – piano
Fred Marshall – double bass
Jerry Granelli – drums
Additional
Ralph J. Gleason – liner notes

Release history

References

External links 
 

1963 albums
Collaborative albums
Fantasy Records albums
Vince Guaraldi albums
Bola Sete albums